The year 2008 is the tenth year in the history of King of the Cage, a mixed martial arts promotion based in the United States. In 2008 King of the Cage held 26 events, KOTC: Hard Knocks.

Title fights

Events list

KOTC: Sub Zero

KOTC: Sub Zero was an event held on January 12, 2008, at Lake of the Torches in Lac du Flambeau, Wisconsin.

Results

KOTC: Premiere

KOTC: Premiere was an event held on January 24, 2008, at San Manuel Casino in Highland, California.

Results

KOTC: Warlords

KOTC: Warlords was an event held on February 9, 2008, at Ute Mountain Casino in Towaoc, Colorado.

Results

KOTC: Stand Off

KOTC: Stand Off was an event held on February 22, 2008, at The Soaring Eagle Casino in Mt. Pleasant, MI.

Results

KOTC: All Wisconsin Fight Quest

KOTC: All Wisconsin Fight Quest was an event held on March 15, 2008, at Lake of the Torches in Lac du Flambeau, Wisconsin.

KOTC: Protege

KOTC: Protege was an event held on March 22, 2008, at The Avi Resort & Casino in Laughlin, Nevada.

Results

KOTC: Tsunami II

KOTC: Tsunami II was an event held on March 27, 2008, at The San Manuel Casino in Highland, California.

Results

KOTC: Twisted

KOTC: Twisted was an event held on April 5, 2008.

KOTC: Fight Nite @ The Shrine

KOTC: Fight Nite @ The Shrine was an event held on April 19, 2008.

Results

KOTC: Opposing Force

KOTC: Opposing Force was an event held on May 15, 2008, at The San Manuel Casino in Highland, California.

Results

KOTC: Reckless

KOTC: Reckless was an event held on May 17, 2008, at The Harlow's Casino Resort in Greenville, Mississippi.

Results

KOTC: Rising Stars

KOTC: Rising Stars was an event held on May 24, 2008, at Kiowa Casino in Devol, Oklahoma.

Results

KOTC: Smashing Machine

KOTC: Smashing Machine was an event held on May 31, 2008, at Ute Mountain Casino in Towaoc, Colorado.

Results

KOTC: Settlement

KOTC: Settlement was an event held on June 13, 2008, at The Soaring Eagle Casino in Mount Pleasant, Michigan.

Results

KOTC: Badlands

KOTC: Badlands was an event held on July 12, 2008, at The Isleta Casino in Albuquerque, New Mexico.

Results

KOTC: Rock Solid

KOTC: Rock Solid was an event held on July 19, 2008, at The Lake of the Torches Casino in Lac du Flambeau, Wisconsin.

Results

KOTC: Bio Hazard

KOTC: Bio Hazard was an event held on August 14, 2008, at The San Manuel Casino in Highland, California.

Results

KOTC: Retribution

KOTC: Retribution was an event held on August 30, 2008, at The Ute Mountain Casino in Cortez, Colorado.

Results

KOTC: Cage Masters

KOTC: Cage Masters was an event held on October 4, 2008, at The Avi Resort and Casino in Laughlin, Nevada.

Results

KOTC: Misconduct

KOTC: Misconduct was an event held on October 16, 2008, at The San Manuel Casino in Highland, California.

Results

KOTC: Level One

KOTC: Level One was an event held on October 18, 2008, at The Lake of the Torches Casino in Lac du Flambeau, Wisconsin.

Results

KOTC: Frost Bite

KOTC: Frost Bite was an event held on November 7, 2008, at The Kewadin Casino in Sault Ste. Marie, Michigan.

Results

KOTC: Bragging Rights

KOTC: Bragging Rights was an event held on November 20, 2008, at The Ohio Expo Center Coliseum in Columbus, Ohio.

KOTC: Anticipation

KOTC: Anticipation was an event held on November 26, 2008, at The Soaring Eagle Casino in Mount Pleasant, Michigan.

Results

KOTC: Goodfellas

KOTC: Goodfellas was an event held on December 6, 2008, at The Isleta Casino in Albuquerque, New Mexico.

Results

KOTC: Prowler

KOTC: Prowler was an event held on December 11, 2008, at The San Manuel Casino in Highland, California.

Results

See also 
 List of King of the Cage events
 List of King of the Cage champions

References

King of the Cage events
2008 in mixed martial arts